Monsters, Inc. Scream Arena is a 2002 sports game developed by Radical Entertainment and published by THQ for the GameCube. The game is based on the 2002 film Monsters, Inc..

Plot
As seen in the movie, the monsters of Monsters, Inc. need to come up with another source of power for their worlds. The game starts off with a cut scene where the characters are doing their work trying to make the child laugh. When they fail, another character has a ball thrown at them causing an uproar of laughs. This also causes the laugh power meter to increase. This sparks their idea to start an all out war of dodge ball to keep the power running throughout their world.

It is a basic dodgeball game with sheer simplicity aimed at a very young audience. The game starts in a specially designed arena, where monsters are lined up like in actual dodgeball and throw laugh balls at each other. There are a total of seven arenas and other bonus stages and mini-games which will be unlocked as the game progresses.

Gameplay
Each player's goal is to throw balls at competing players, while doing this each monster will react differently upon contact. The ultimate goal is to knock off your opponent and fill the laughter canister with children's laughter first. 
There are a total of 13 monsters among which a player can choose among five to start with. More playable monsters and stages will be unlocked as the game progresses in single-player mode. Each arena is based on a scene from the movie and has five different objectives, like obtaining the most points from pure hits, hitting targets, holding on a special ball longest and more. Only after completing them the player can move on to the next arena. Also, there are different types of balls which are fast, slow, sticky and explosive. 

The game has both single-player mode and multi-player mode with up to four players. In both modes the winner is the first monster to knock off the opponents.

Game modes
There is a wide variety of different types of games that are available to play.

 Whoever gets hit the fewest times wins the round.
 Hit the targets that appear in the room the most to win. 
 The player who is able to hold the special ball the longest before another player knocks it out of their hands wins.
 The team who has the fewest balls on their side of the room wins.

Reception

The game received "unfavorable" reviews according to the review aggregation website Metacritic.

References

External links
 

2002 video games
Disney sports video games
Disney video games
Dodgeball video games
GameCube games
GameCube-only games
Scream Arena
Radical Entertainment games
THQ games
Video games based on films
Video games developed in Canada
Multiplayer and single-player video games